Ty - supermodel was a Russian reality show on the STS TV channel, in which aspiring models vied for a contract with international modeling agency worth 250,000 dollars. The anchor of the show for the first two cycles was Fyodor Bondarchuk. Then Alexander Tsekalo took over for cycle 3. The host of the fourth cycle was Bondarchuk's wife, popular presenter Svetlana Bondarchuk.

The first cycle was held in 2004 and was won by 17-year-old Ksenia Kahnovich who refused the first prize, which was a contract with NEXT model management because she had already received a more lucrative offer by that time. Since the time of her victory, Kahnovich has become a very successful model, having walked in fashion shows for big names such as Versace, Louis Vuitton, Christian Dior and Dolce and Gabbana in New York, Paris and Milan.

Cycle two was held exactly one year after the first one and saw victory for Svetlana Sergienko, who was asked by Russian president Vladimir Putin to join the parliament as a representative for the growing modeling industry in Russia.

The show was discontinued after four cycles and returned under the name Top Model po-russki on Muz-TV in 2011.

Format

The finalists live in a house together in Moscow, and face different competitions in modeling, sports and entertainment. At the end of each episode there is an elimination round where one girl is sent home until there is only one girl left.

Prominent faces of Russia's entertainment and modeling industry co-star as mentors or guest judges, giving their opinions and helping decide the eliminations at the end of the show. The main photographers as of the end of cycle were Dmitry Zhuravlev and Vladimir Glynin.

Cycles

References

External links
You Are a Supermodel, Cycle 1
You Are a Supermodel, Cycle 2
You Are a Supermodel, Cycle 4

STS (TV channel) original programming
Top Model series (Russia)
2004 Russian television series debuts
2007 Russian television series endings
2000s Russian television series
Russian television series based on American television series
Television shows filmed in Russia